The Troika is a 1997 science fiction novel by American writer Stepan Chapman. Written in surrealist style, the novel features a highly complex plot mixing fantasy and science fiction. It received the Philip K. Dick Award for 1997.

Plot summary
The novel introduces three beings – a jeep, a dinosaur, and an old Mexican woman – travelling across a desert under the glare of three suns. They have been travelling for centuries though they do not know why they are crossing the desert or if they will ever reach the other side. The characters have each changed bodies several times. Their travels are interspersed with dream-sequence-like flashbacks describing various transformed versions of the 20th Century.

Major characters
 Alex – an automated jeep, who began as a man then became cyborg.
 Eva – an old Mexican woman, formerly a fish-priestess and later a whore.
 Naomi – a brontosaur who was once a military corpsicle. A daughter of Alex and Eva's.

References

1997 American novels
1997 science fiction novels
American science fiction novels